The 2003–04 TVS Cup (named after sponsor TVS) was a One Day International cricket tournament held in India from 23 October to 18 November 2003. It was a tri-nation series between the Australia, India and New Zealand. Australia defeated India in the final to win the tournament.

Squads

Matches

1st ODI

2nd ODI

3rd ODI

4th ODI

5th ODI

6th ODI

7th ODI

8th ODI

9th ODI

Final

Notes

References

External links
 Series home at ESPN Cricinfo

One Day International cricket competitions
2003 in Indian cricket
TVS Group